"Oceans" is a song by American rapper Jay-Z recorded for his twelfth studio album Magna Carta Holy Grail. The song features American singer Frank Ocean and was produced by Pharrell Williams, with additional production from Timbaland. The song has peaked at number 83 on the U.S. Billboard Hot 100.

Recording and composition 
"Oceans", along with another song from Magna Carta Holy Grail titled "Holy Grail" were recorded in 2011 during the recording sessions for Jay-Z's collaborative album with Kanye West, Watch the Throne. West wanted the two songs to appear on Watch the Throne, but Jay-Z chose to keep them for his upcoming twelfth studio album and they were replaced with "No Church in the Wild" and "Made in America".

Chart performance

References 

2013 songs
Jay-Z songs
Frank Ocean songs
Song recordings produced by Pharrell Williams
Songs written by Jay-Z
Songs written by Timbaland
Songs written by Pharrell Williams
Song recordings produced by Timbaland
Songs written by Frank Ocean